KSN may refer to:

KSNF, a television station (channel 16) licensed to Joplin, Missouri, United States
KSNT, a television station (channel 27 digital/virtual) licensed to Topeka, Kansas, United States
 The Kansas State Network and its five component stations:
KSNW, a television station (channel 3 virtual/45 digital) licensed to Wichita, Kansas, United States
KSNL-LD - a television repeater station (channel 47 digital) licensed to Salina, Kansas, United States
KSNC - a television station (channel 22 digital/2 virtual) licensed to Great Bend, Kansas, United States
KSNG - a television station (channel 11 digital/virtual) licensed to Garden City, Kansas, United States
KSNK - a television station (channel 8 virtual/12 digital) licensed to McCook, Nebraska, United States
 Kostanay Airport, an airport in Kazakhstan